Earl Attlee is a title in the Peerage of the United Kingdom. It was created on 16 December 1955 for Clement Attlee, the former Labour prime minister. At the same time he was made Viscount Prestwood, of Walthamstow in the County of Essex, which serves as the subsidiary title to the earldom and is also in the Peerage of the United Kingdom.

As of 2022, the titles are held by his grandson, the third Earl, who succeeded his father in 1991. He is one of the ninety elected hereditary peers that remain in the House of Lords after the passing of the House of Lords Act 1999. In contrast to his father and grandfather, the current Lord Attlee is a member of the Conservative Party.

Air Vice-Marshal Donald Laurence Attlee, CB, LVO, DL (2 September 1922 – 28 April 2021), was a nephew of the 1st Earl Attlee.

Earls Attlee (1955)
Clement Richard Attlee, 1st Earl Attlee (1883–1967)
Martin Richard Attlee, 2nd Earl Attlee (1927–1991)
John Richard Attlee, 3rd Earl Attlee (born 1956)

There is no heir to the earldom.

References

Bibliography
Kidd, Charles, Williamson, David (editors). Debrett's Peerage and Baronetage (1990 edition). New York: St Martin's Press, 1990.

 
Earldoms in the Peerage of the United Kingdom
1955 establishments in the United Kingdom
Noble titles created in 1955
Clement Attlee
Attlee
Noble titles created for UK MPs